The 2015–16 Southern Utah Thunderbirds basketball team represented Southern Utah University during the 2015–16 NCAA Division I men's basketball season. The Thunderbirds were led by fourth-year head coach Nick Robinson and played their home games at the Centrum Arena in Cedar City, Utah. They were members of the Big Sky Conference. The Thunderbirds finished the season 5–24, 3–15 in Big Sky play to finish in a tie for 11th place. They lost in the first round of the Big Sky tournament to North Dakota.

On March 9, 2016, head coach Nick Robinson was fired. He finished at SUU with a four-year record of 28–90. On March 22, the school hired Todd Simon as head coach.

Previous season
The Thunderbirds finished the season 2014–15 season 10–19, 7–11 in Big Sky play to finish in ninth place. They failed to qualify for the Big Sky tournament.

Departures

Incoming Transfers

2015 incoming recruits

Roster

Schedule

|-
! colspan="9" style="background:#f00; color:#fff;"| Exhibition

|-
! colspan="9" style="background:#f00; color:#fff;"| Non-conference regular season

|-
! colspan="9" style="background:#f00; color:#fff;"| Big Sky regular season

|-
! colspan="9" style="background:#f00; color:#fff;"| Big Sky tournament

References

2015-16 team
2015–16 Big Sky Conference men's basketball season
2015 in sports in Utah
2016 in sports in Utah